James Kennedy Burnett (January 24, 1862 - September 14, 1948) was a California politician who served in the California State Assembly from the 67th district between 1897 and 1901. In 1899, when Speaker of the Assembly Howard E. Wright was plagued with scandals involving vote-buying and forging campaign documents, the penalty for the latter being forfeiture of office, Burnett introduced an expulsion resolution before Wright resigned his office.

References 

1862 births
1948 deaths
Members of the California State Assembly